My Grandson, the Doctor is a Singaporean English-language sitcom. It starred Nicholas Lee, Jacintha Abisheganaden, Michelle Goh, Susan Quah, Neo Swee Lin, Jasmin Samat Simon and Koh Chieng Mun.

For his performance in the series, Samat won the Best Actor award for the comedy/light entertainment category at the Asian Television Awards in 1997.

Cast

Main
Nicholas Lee as Dr. Benedict Wee
Jacintha Abisheganaden as Maureen Veerappan
Michelle Goh as Pamela Heng
Susan Quah as Susan
Neo Swee Lin
Jasmin Samat Simon as Dr. Jaafar Hussein
Koh Chieng Mun

Recurring
 Von Leong as Li Hwa

Reception
Carol Leong of The New Paper wrote that "Devotees of TCS sitcoms will enjoy the faintly absurd scenarios, the local humour and the sight of Jacintha playing it matronly."

Ong Sor Fern of The Straits Times wrote that the series has an "annoying share of well-educated actors trying to speak street English", and is "much too insipid to inspire many memories."

References

1996 Singaporean television series debuts
1997 Singaporean television series endings
Singaporean television sitcoms
Singaporean comedy television series
Channel 5 (Singapore) original programming